Now (formerly Now TV and often stylised as NOW) is a subscription over-the-top internet television service operated by British satellite television provider Sky. Launched in the United Kingdom in 2012, the service is also available in Ireland, Italy and Germany.

Now offers both live streaming and video-on-demand without a contract. The service offers "passes" for various types of content, for a monthly fee on a pay-as-you-go basis. Differing passes offer films, sports and entertainment from Sky such as material from Sky Atlantic and Sky Cinema, and from British and American licensed third-parties such as Fox. The service is available to consumers through retail Roku-based Now TV digital media players (in both set-top box and HDMI dongle form factors) as well as via an app on computers, various mobile devices, some game consoles and set-top boxes. It is separate from and not viewable through the Sky Go Internet service, or via Sky's digital satellite television service Sky Q.

History and coverage

Sky Picnic
Sky Picnic was a proposed pay television service which would have sat alongside Freeview and Top Up TV on the digital terrestrial television (DTT) platform in the United Kingdom. The proposal detailed replacing Sky's three free-to-air channels (Sky News, Sky Sports News and Sky Three) with five pay TV channels: Sky Sports 1, Sky Movies SD1 plus Sky One during the evening with one hour of Sky News content. There would also be two further daytime channels: a factual channel and a children's channel. It was first proposed in 2007 but was subject to a public consultation by Ofcom. Whilst the service was cleared to launch in 2010 it never officially launched, Sky having put it on hold in 2008.

The Sky Picnic proposal was ultimately suspended by the internet-based Now TV platform.

Now TV
Now TV was unveiled by Sky UK in March 2012, and designed for people who have no existing pay TV subscription. Its official launch was on 17 July 2012, initially providing films, putting it in competition with Lovefilm and Netflix.

The Now TV service was later extended to other territories covered by the Sky Group. In 2014 a similar internet service called "Sky Online" was launched by Sky Deutschland in Germany and Austria, and by Sky Italia in Italy in 2015. In 2016, Sky Online in Germany and Austria was revamped as "Sky Ticket" and structured the same as Now TV in the UK, and was rebranded in Italy under the original British name of Now TV. On 26 April 2017, Now TV launched in Ireland. On 11 September 2017, the service launched as simply "Sky" in Spain, the first Sky-branded product in that country. In March 2019, Sky X launched in Austria, making use of a blend of Now TV and Sky Q elements, and gradually replaced Sky Ticket, as an offering between Sky Ticket and the full TV service Sky Q. On 1 September 2020, Sky stopped offering the product in Spain.

In Summer 2016, Sky UK extended the brand to telecommunication services by launching contract-free budget broadband internet in the UK, initially named Now TV Combo, and from early 2018 branded as Now Broadband.

In Early 2021, Now TV rebranded as NOW.

In Summer 2022, Sky Ticket rebranded to WOW.

Spain
Sky España was a service of Sky and supplied over-the-top pay television and video on demand service accessible only through the Internet created to compete with Movistar+, Netflix, and Amazon Prime Video in Spain.

Yoigo is an operator of Internet and mobile services which maintains an exclusive agreement that allows customers to the rate into Fibra + la Sinfín with unlimited fibre access to Sky España service for €6 per month.

The service ceased to be available on 1 September 2020. Some content had already disappeared prior to it closing on 10 August 2020.

Content and channels
Upon its UK debut in 2012, Now TV offered only films at first, adding sports in March 2013, and entertainment channels in October 2013. Film and entertainment channels are accessed by paying a monthly fee, and sports on an ad-hoc basis ("pay as you go"). Unlike Sky's flagship satellite TV service, Now TV does not require a long-term contract.

Now TV offers "passes" with a specific set of content or channels that can be watched on demand or as live TV. The "Entertainment" pass has general entertainment content/channels from Sky itself (e.g. Sky One) and third-parties (e.g. Syfy), whilst the "Kids" pass covers children's networks such as Nickelodeon, and a "Sky Cinema" pass offers over a thousand films from Sky Cinema. There is also a dedicated "Hayu" pass, and a "Sports" pass (which offers a daily or monthly option), along with a sports pass solely for mobile devices to stream live Sky Sports channels.

The Now TV boxes and dongles have extra downloadable apps that provide access to free catch-up or streaming services such as BBC iPlayer, ITVX, and UKTV Play, as well as access to Sky Store, Netflix (added in late 2018), Peacock (added in November 2021), Sky Sports Box Office, Disney+ (added in April 2020) and YouTube. From Spring 2020, Now TV provided access to BT Sport, and at the same time Now TV became available for BT TV customers.

On 28 June 2022, National Geographic departed the service as its programming moved over to Disney+. In its place, Now users had access to UKTV's mystery drama channel Alibi and NBC News Now, whilst customers with the Sky Cinema subscription package could access a range of films from Paramount+.

List of channels on Now

Entertainment
 Sky Showcase
 Sky Atlantic
 Sky Max
 Sky Witness
 Alibi
 Gold
 Sky Comedy
 Comedy Central
 MTV
 Peacock
 Sky Documentaries
 Sky Crime
 Sky Nature
 Sky History
 Sky Sci-Fi
 Sky News
 Sky Arts
 NBC News NOW

Films
 Sky Cinema Premiere
 Sky Cinema Feel Good
 Sky Cinema Hits
 Sky Cinema Action
 Sky Cinema Animation 
 Sky Cinema Family
 Sky Cinema Comedy
 Sky Cinema Sci-Fi Horror
 Sky Cinema Thriller
 Sky Cinema Greats
 Sky Cinema Drama

Kids
 Nickelodeon
 Nick Jr.
 Nicktoons
 Cartoon Network
 Boomerang
 Cartoonito
 Sky Kids

Sport
 Sky Sports News
 Sky Sports Main Event
 Sky Sports Premier League
 Sky Sports Football
 Sky Sports Cricket
 Sky Sports Golf
 Sky Sports F1
 Sky Sports NFL
 Sky Sports Arena
 Sky Sports Racing
 Sky Sports Mix

Devices
Now is available on a number of platforms, providing access via both big-screen and small screen mobile devices (correct as of April 2020):

Now TV proprietary devices
Now TV Player app on PC or Tablet running Windows 8.1 or later; Mac computers running OS X Mavericks 10.9 or later
Android devices via app.
iOS 13 or later devices via app.
Amazon Fire TV devices 
Xbox One and Xbox Series X/S (Xbox 360 no longer supported)
PlayStation 4 and PlayStation 5 (PlayStation 3 no longer supported)
Roku LT (Purple), XS, 3 (Black), Streaming Stick
Apple TV 4th generation and later (3rd gen no longer supported)
Chromecast
YouView including BT TV/TalkTalk TV (the full Now TV service Now TV was added on 21 February 2020)
Sony Bravia most TVs manufactured since 2016
LG selected smart TVs, Blu-ray players and sound bars
Samsung selected smart TVs

The service offers streams at up to 720p resolution (or up to 1080p resolution, when subscribed to Now TV HD Boost at an extra cost) depending on the playback device. It uses adaptive bitrate streaming.

Now TV hardware
  
In July 2013, Sky launched a white Now TV-branded Roku streaming box, allowing users to stream Now TV content to their television via an analogue baseband connection or an HDMI input. It retailed for £9.99. It has limited access to the Roku Channel Store and only a pre-approved list of channels can be downloaded. A number of third-party channels can be side-loaded to the device using its Developer Mode.

In August 2015, Sky launched the Now TV Box 2 (based around a 2015 Roku 2) in black. It offers the same content as the original Now TV (white) box, but has a faster processor, an Ethernet port alongside Wi-Fi, a USB port and an SD card slot (not functional by default), and is capable of outputting at full HD (1080p) resolution.  Unlike the original Now TV Box, the Now TV Box 2 does not have an analogue audio/video output socket.

The Now TV Smart Box ("Smart Box with Freeview"), coloured black with a blue logo, was launched exclusively in the UK in July 2016. It includes access to Freeview channels through an aerial, via an internal DTT tuner that allows the user to pause (for up to 30 minutes) and rewind live TV.

In January 2018, Sky introduced the Now TV Smart Stick dongle which plugs directly into a TV's HDMI input and includes voice search. It was noted as the cheapest smart TV stick in the UK, costing £14.99 at launch compared to £39.99 for its rival Amazon Fire TV Stick.

The second generation Now TV Smart Box ("Smart Box with 4K") was introduced in September 2018 and is coloured black with a pink logo. It is smaller in size (mainly due to the removal of the Freeview TV tuner) and includes the voice search capability from the Smart Stick. This box is capable of streaming at 2160p (4K) resolution.

NOW TV recently re-branded to NOW  has announced late in 2021 that it is discontinuing all NOW hardware products.

Reception
As of Q4 2018, Now TV had a 10% share in the UK OTT subscription market, placing it third behind Netflix and Amazon Prime Video.

Trademark disputes
Before its launch, Hong Kong based PCCW filed trademark complaints about British Sky Broadcasting (BSkyB)'s Now TV service. In October 2012, a High Court judgment in London ruled that BSkyB did not infringe PCCW's rights regarding the Now TV name.

References

External links
  for the United Kingdom and Ireland
  for Germany (WOW)
  for Italy

Sky Group
Internet properties established in 2012
2012 establishments in the United Kingdom
Streaming television
Video on demand services